Football Club Bassin d'Arcachon Sud is a French association football club founded in 1923. They are based in Arcachon, Gironde and as of the 2020–21 season they play in the Régional 1, the sixth tier in the French football league system. They play at the Stade Jean Brousse in Arcachon.

History
On 3 June 2003, Bassin d'Arcachon merged with a local side, FC Gujan-Mestras, then with La Teste Fc in 2014, to form the club that exists today. Their first manager in this era was the legendary Frenchman Jean-Pierre Papin, who contributed to the club's promotion to CFA 2 in 2005, before leaving to manage Ligue 1 side RC Strasbourg Alsace. He made his return in 2014 with the club in Championnat de France Amateur 2.

Coaching staff
 Head coach:  Steeve Savidan
 Assistant coach:  Gauthier Mesple

Current squad
As of 20 May 2020

References

External links
 

Association football clubs established in 1923
1923 establishments in France
Sport in Gironde
Football clubs in Nouvelle-Aquitaine